"Díganle" is a song by American singers Leslie Grace and Becky G. It was released by Sony Music Latin on September 28, 2017. A remix version with CNCO was released on August 16, 2018.

Charts

Certifications

References

2017 songs
Leslie Grace songs
Becky G songs
CNCO songs
Songs written by Tainy
Songs written by Becky G